Ruben Barrales (born 1962) is the former Deputy Assistant to President George W. Bush, and was also the Director of the Office of Intergovernmental Affairs. He then served as the CEO of the San Diego Regional Chamber of Commerce. He is currently the President and CEO of GROW Elect, a political action committee that recruits, endorses, trains, and funds Latino Republican candidates for public office. He also serves on the board of directors for the Public Policy Institute of California. Barrales has also run as a candidate for the state government post of California State Controller.

Barrales identifies as a Mexican American and is recognized as the first Latino person to serve on the San Mateo County Board of Supervisors. Barrales has also appeared in the Hispanic Business Magazine's "100 Most Influential Hispanics" list on three occasions within the last ten years

Early life and education
Barrales is the son of Mexican immigrants from Mexico City, Mexico, and was raised in Redwood City, California. His father owned a roofing company. His father was paralyzed from a fall from a roof during a roofing job during Ruben's youth.

He attended Nativity Catholic School in Menlo Park, California and graduated from Junípero Serra High School (San Mateo, California) in 1980. He graduated from the University of California, Riverside with a BA in political science in administrative studies.

He is married and has two kids, Ryan and Rachel.

Political career
Barrales was first registered as a Democrat before he ran for San Mateo County Supervisor. In 1992, he was elected San Mateo County Supervisor, and became the first elected Latino Supervisor in the county. He was re-elected in 1996.

As a county Supervisor, he helped lower crime in East Palo Alto by collaborating with Sheriff Don Horsley and other cities to form the Gang Suppression Task Force. This was needed in East Palo Alto, a city that the Federal Bureau of Investigation considered the homicide capital of the United States in 1992, after 42 killings took place that year. He also supported the citizens of Redwood City in bringing the Shot Spotter to Redwood City to reduce random gun fire. Redwood City was instrumental in the development of the Gunshot Location System, which was possible through funding by San Mateo County and the major portion by the City of Redwood City.

In 1998, Barrales was the Republican candidate for California State Controller, though he failed to unseat Kathleen Connell. He received 2,652,115 votes (33%) to Connell's 4,874,097 votes (61%). Although he lost, the run for California State Controller gained him national attention. In 2001, he was appointed as Deputy Assistant to the President and Director of Intergovermental Affairs in the White House by President George W. Bush.

Private sector
After one and a half terms on the county board of supervisors he moved to the private sector, becoming President and CEO of Joint Venture: Silicon Valley Network in San Jose, California.

Following his stint in the White House he became President and CEO of the San Diego Regional Chamber of Commerce in December 2006.

Notation
 Barrales is listed among the 100 most influential Hispanics/Latinos in the United States.
 Barrales served as a member of the Speaker's Commission on the California Initiative Process.
 Barrales served as Advisor for the Stanford Institute for Economic Policy Research.
 Barrales served as Vice-Chairman of the California Commission on Local Governance for the 21st Century.
 Barrales served as a member of the California Speaker's Commission on State and Local Government Finance.
 Barrales was recently featured in San Diego Magazine for his contributions to the strength of the Latino community in San Diego.

Community service
He was a founding member of Garfield Charter School, in the Redwood City Elementary School District. Garfield Charter School was one of the first charter schools in California. He was instrumental in getting Garfield's Charter and secured funding for the first years.

He also served as Director of the Peninsula Conflict Resolution Center.

References

External links
 Smart Voter Election Results - smartvoter.org
 Full Biography for Ruben Barrales - smartvoter.org
 San Mateo Board of Supervisors
  Redwood City was instrumental in the development of the Gunshot Location System.
 Reversal of Misfortune (East Palo Alto)
 http://www.garfield.rcsd.k12.ca.us/ Garfield Charter School

George W. Bush administration personnel
University of California, Riverside alumni
Living people
Mexican-American people in California politics
San Mateo County Supervisors
1961 births
Politicians from San Diego
People from Redwood City, California
California Republicans
Junípero Serra High School (San Mateo, California) alumni